Onchidoridoidea is a taxonomic superfamily of sea slugs, dorid nudibranchs, marine gastropod molluscs.

Families
Families within the superfamily Onchidoridoidea are as follows:
 Akiodorididae Millen & Martynov 2005
 Calycidorididae Roginskaya, 1972
 Goniodorididae H. Adams & A. Adams, 1854
 Onchidorididae Gray, 1827
 Corambidae Bergh, 1871

References

 
Taxa named by John Edward Gray